Cannabinor (PRS-211,375) is a drug which acts as a potent and selective cannabinoid CB2 receptor agonist. It is classed as a "nonclassical" cannabinoid with a chemical structure similar to that of cannabidiol. It has a CB2 affinity of 17.4nM vs 5585nM at CB1, giving it over 300x selectivity for CB2. It showed analgesic effects in animal studies especially in models of neuropathic pain, but failed in Phase IIb human clinical trials due to lack of efficacy.

See also
 Cannabicyclohexanol
 O-1871

References 

Cannabinoids